Revolucion 13 is the second full-length album by Tribe of Gypsies, a Latin rock band based in the San Fernando Valley, California, USA. It is the first recording with the Native American singer Gregg Analla (ex-Seventh Sign, 9.0) on lead vocals.

After the vocalist Dean Ortega left to front his own project, Revolution Child, the remaining members of Tribe Of Gypsies wrote, rehearsed and recorded all of the music for their new album instrumentally, cutting tracks live in the studio with the full band. Months later they were put in touch with the singer Gregg Analla in New Mexico whose band, Seventh Sign, had just broken up.  Analla went to Los Angeles after he was sent some tracks to work on at home and recorded his vocals at Warrior guitarist Joe Floyd's studio, completing the album.

Musical guests on Revolucion 13 include performers from the Nothing Lasts Forever mini-album, the Downset vocalist Rey Oropeza and keyboard players Greg Shultz (Driver, Joshua), as well as Ray Rodriguez who became the band's full-time keyboard player.

Track listing
Aztlan (2:15)
What's Up? (4:20)
Summer Rain (6:02)
Revolucion 13 (8:38)
Landslide (5:39)
Spanish Blue (7:01)
Collapse (4:54)
Mother's Cry (8:05)
Aztlan (Reprise) (3:50)
Pancho Villa Part 1 (4:19)
Freedom (7:51)

Notes
Musicians
Roy Z - guitar, vocals, percussion
Gregg Analla - vocals
Edward Casillas - bass guitar, vocals, percussion
Elvis Balladares - percussion
Mario Aguilar - timbales, percussion
David Ingraham - drums, percussion

Guest musicians
Rey Oropeza: vocals on "What's Up"
Victor Baez: Bata on "Revolucion 13", vocals and conga on "Pancho Villa"
Mario Q: vocals on "Freedom"
Al Martin: flute, vocals
Ray Rodriguez: B3, Rhodes on "Aztlan", "What's Up" and "Spanish Blue"
David Torres: piano on "Aztlan Reprise"
Greg Schultz: B3, mellotron, piano, ARP on "Summer Rain", "Revolucion 13", "Landslide", "Collapse" and "Mother's Cry"

Production credits
Produced by Roy Z
Co-produced by Joe Floyd & Tribe Of Gypsies
Engineered and mixed by Joe Floyd & Roy Z
Assistant engineer: Rich 'The Guru' Carrette
Recorded and mixed at Silver Cloud, Burbank, CA
Vocal pre-production at Sound Chaser Studios, Albuquerque, NM
Mastered by Dave Collins at A&M Mastering
Drum tech: Matt Loneau
Drum rentals: Jorge Palacios
Guitar tech: The Guru

Sources
TribeOfGypsies.com discography

1998 albums
Victor Entertainment albums
Tribe of Gypsies albums